Li Li (born 15 November 1976) is a Chinese former professional tennis player.

Li competed on the professional circuit in the 1990s and featured in a total of 13 ties for the China Fed Cup team. In Fed Cup tennis she had a 17–4 overall win–loss record, with wins in nine of her ten singles rubbers.

On the WTA Tour, Li twice made the second round of the China Open, in both 1995 and 1996.

At the 1998 Asian Games in Bangkok, she was a member of the silver medal winning Chinese team and won a women's doubles bronze medal with Yi Jing-Qian.

ITF finals

Singles (1–1)

Doubles (3–3)

See also
 List of China Fed Cup team representatives

External links
 
 
 

1976 births
Living people
Chinese female tennis players
Asian Games medalists in tennis
Asian Games silver medalists for China
Asian Games bronze medalists for China
Tennis players at the 1998 Asian Games
Medalists at the 1998 Asian Games
20th-century Chinese women
21st-century Chinese women